Shahrak-e Aras (also known as Shahrak-e Sadāras and Shahrak) is a village in Gejlarat-e Sharqi Rural District of Aras District of Poldasht County, West Azerbaijan province, Iran. At the 2006 National Census, its population was 1,951 in 481 households, when it was in the former Poldasht District of Maku County. The following census in 2011 counted 1,821 people in 511 households, by which time the district had been separated from the county, Poldasht County established, and divided into two districts: the Central and Aras Districts. The latest census in 2016 showed a population of 1,888 people in 537 households; it was the largest village in its rural district.

References 

Poldasht County

Populated places in West Azerbaijan Province

Populated places in Poldasht County